Alex Richards is an American journalist, who with Marshall Allen, won the 2011 Goldsmith Prize for Investigative Reporting.

Life
He was a reporter for the Las Vegas Sun.
The "Do No Harm" project was based on data mining, and analysing hospital records turned over to the State of Nevada.

He is a reporter for The Chronicle of Higher Education.

Works
"Do No Harm", Las Vegas Sun

References

External links
"Chronicle Reporter Wins Major Award for Investigative Journalism", March 8, 2011
"alex richards", The Chronicle of Higher Education

Living people
American male journalists
Year of birth missing (living people)